V. Jeyalakshmi was an Indian politician and former Member of Parliament elected from Tamil Nadu. She was elected to the Lok Sabha from Sivakasi constituency as an Indian National Congress candidate in 1971, and 1977 elections.

References 

Indian National Congress politicians from Tamil Nadu
Living people
India MPs 1971–1977
India MPs 1977–1979
Lok Sabha members from Tamil Nadu
Women in Tamil Nadu politics
20th-century Indian women politicians
20th-century Indian politicians
People from Virudhunagar district
Year of birth missing (living people)